Lindsay James is a Democratic politician who has represented the 99th District in the Iowa House of Representatives since 2019.

Education
James graduated from West Linn High School in 1999. She obtained a degree in communications from Santa Clara University 2003 and earned her master's degree in divinity from Fuller Theological Seminary in 2007.

Career
James was a minister for Menlo Park Presbyterian Church from 2007 to 2010, an interfaith chaplain for Endicott College from 2012 to 2015, and an associate pastor for Westminster Presbyterian Church from 2016 to 2017. Starting in 2015, she was an adjunct professor for the University of Dubuque. In 2017, James co-founded and directed the Loras College Peace Institute.

Electoral history

Personal life 
James lives with her husband Christopher and two children.

References

External links
 
Twitter account
Iowa House Democrats profile
Dubuque County Democratic Party page

Living people
Politicians from Dubuque, Iowa
Women state legislators in Iowa
Date of birth missing (living people)
Democratic Party members of the Iowa House of Representatives
Place of birth missing (living people)
21st-century American politicians
University of Dubuque
American Presbyterian ministers
Santa Clara University alumni
Fuller Theological Seminary alumni
Year of birth missing (living people)
21st-century American women politicians